Ransford Brempong (born July 22, 1981) is a former Canadian National Team member and professional basketball player for the Fraser Valley Bandits of the Canadian Elite Basketball League (CEBL). He currently works as the colour commentator for the team. He also runs WCT Hoops which is a basketball organization that offers high level training and development for athletes in high school. Where he continues to provide opportunities for the next generation of basketball players in BC through his Bubble24 teams. He also runs a primary age basketball club called 3PointBasketball where we look to cultivate the love for the game at an early age.

Career 
Brempong played college basketball for the Western Carolina Catamounts where he was a 5yr starter. While at WCU he broke his conferences all time shot block record. He then went on to play professionally and played for Matrixx Magixx and Donar (then named Hanzevast Capitals for sponsorship reasons) in the Netherlands and Bayer Giants Leverkusen and Gloria Giants Düsseldorf in Germany.

In 2018, after being retired for 6 years Brempong joined the St. John's Edge of the National Basketball League of Canada (NBLC). He then went on to play for the Fraser Valley Bandits of the Canadian Elite Basketball League (CEBL) in 2019.

Brempong also spent nearly 8yrs playing for the Canadian National Team. He first made the Jr. National Team in 2001 and eventually made his way up the ranks to the Senior Mens team where he competed for 3 summers. During this time Brempong had the fortune to play with and against many basketball greats such as Kobe Bryant, Dwayne Wade, Chris Paul, Dirk Nowitzki, Yao Ming, Steve Nash, Carmelo Anthony, Kelly Olynyk, and Kevin Martin.

Personal 
Born in Winnipeg, Manitoba to parents from Ghana, west Africa.
Brempong moved to Toronto in 1993 where he spent the rest of his elementary/high school days in Thornhill, Ontario. While in high school, Ransford was selected to the Toronto Star top 5 player in the greater Toronto area. He spent 5 yrs in North Carolina where he went to Western Carolina University. In 2012, he was in a car accident where he broke his back. He spent the next 4 years doing extensive rehab before being able to make a full recovery and play basketball again 6 yrs later. Ransford currently lives in North Vancouver, British Columbia. He is married and has 3 young kids.

References

External links
Eurobasket profile

1981 births
Living people
Canadian expatriate basketball people in the United States
Canadian men's basketball players
Donar (basketball club) players
Dutch Basketball League players
Matrixx Magixx players
Power forwards (basketball)
Sportspeople from Brampton
Western Carolina Catamounts men's basketball players
Basketball people from Ontario
St. John's Edge players
Fraser Valley Bandits players
Black Canadian basketball players
Canadian people of Ghanaian descent